The Apostolic Vicariate of England (and Wales) was an ecclesiastical jurisdiction of the Roman Catholic Church in England and Wales. It was led by a vicar apostolic (or apostolic vicar) who was a titular bishop. The apostolic vicariate was created in 1623 and was divided into four districts in 1688.

Background 
Soon after the accession of Queen Elizabeth I, in 1559, the bishops of England and Wales were forced to choose between taking the Oath of Supremacy, thus denying the authority of the Pope, and losing their episcopal sees. Those who chose to continue their allegiance to Rome were subsequently deposed and replaced in their sees by priests of the Church of England. Most of the deposed Bishops were imprisoned in various locations and died in captivity over a period of years, though some left the country and continued their work overseas. The last of the deposed bishops was Thomas Goldwell, Bishop of St Asaph, who died in Rome on April 3, 1585.

Apostolic Vicariate of England (and Wales)
In 1623, after 65 years of formal absence from England, Pope Urban VIII decided once again to appoint a bishop with actual jurisdiction in England. His choice fell upon William Bishop, who was given the title of Apostolic Vicar of England. Bishop landed secretly in England at midnight on 31 July 1623, but was to die only nine months later.

Bishop was succeeded in office by Richard Smith, also ordained a bishop, who arrived in England in April 1625. However, two warrants were issued for Smith's arrest in August 1631, and he was forced to resign and flee to France, where he eventually died in Paris in 1655. After 1631, there was no Roman Catholic bishop in England for another 54 years, and the void was to some extent filled by a dean and chapter of rather unsure legal status, first established by Bishop and confirmed by Smith.

It was only in 1685 that a successor was appointed by Rome, in the person of John Leyburn, a Doctor of Divinity of the Sorbonne and a former President of the English College at Douai, who was consecrated bishop in Rome on 9 September 1685. In 1623, Bishop had divided England into six areas, at the head of each of which he placed a superior with the title of vicar general, and this had remained the system thereafter. Leyburn reduced these six areas to four. In the summer of 1687 he toured the North of England and confirmed over 20,000 Catholics there.

On 30 January 1688, the number of bishops in England and Wales was increased by the Pope to four vicars apostolic, as a result of which the single apostolic vicariate was divided into the London, Midland, Northern and Western districts.

Office holders

List of Archpriests

List of Vicars Apostolic

See also 
 Religion in the United Kingdom
 Roman Catholicism in England and Wales
 Roman Catholicism in the United Kingdom

References

Bibliography

 
 
 

History of Catholicism in England
England and Wales
England and Wales
England and Wales